"Revive (Say Something)" is the second single from British dance group LuvBug featuring uncredited vocals from British singer Mark Asari. It was released as a digital download on 8 February 2015 in the United Kingdom.

Track listing

Charts

Weekly charts

Release history

References

2015 singles
2015 songs
Polydor Records singles
Songs written by MNEK